Cuthona is a genus of nudibranch in the family Tergipedidae.

Ecology
Cuthona species feed on hydroids, and have uniseriate radulae with polydentate radular teeth.

Taxonomic history
The type species of Cuthona is Cuthona nana, (Alder & Hancock, 1842). Some authorities consider the genera Catriona and Trinchesia to be synonymous with Cuthona. Most Cuthona species were transferred to other genera as a result of DNA phylogeny studies in 2016 and 2017.

Species 
Species in the genus Cuthona include:
 Cuthona divae (Er. Marcus, 1961)
Cuthona methana Valdés, Lundsten & N. G. Wilson, 2018 
 Cuthona nana (Alder & Hancock, 1842)
 Cuthona hermitophila Martynov, Sanamyan & Korshunova, 2015

Species brought into synonymy
 Cuthona abronia (MacFarland, 1966): synonym of Abronica abronia
 Cuthona abyssicola (Bergh, 1884): synonym of Cuthonella abyssicola Bergh, 1884
 Cuthona acinosa (Risbec, 1928): synonym of Tenellia acinosa
 Cuthona akibai Baba, 1984: synonym of Tenellia akibai
 Cuthona albocrusta (MacFarland, 1966): synonym of Tenellia albocrusta
 Cuthona albopunctata (Schmekel, 1968): synonym of Tenellia albopunctata
 Cuthona alpha Baba & Hamatani, 1963: synonym of Tenellia alpha (Baba & Hamatani, 1963) 
 Cuthona amoena (Alder & Hancock, 1845): synonym of Rubramoena amoena
 Cuthona antarctica (Pfeffer in Martens & Pfeffer, 1886): synonym of Tenellia antarctica
 Cuthona anulata (Baba, 1949): synonym of Tenellia anulata
 Cuthona barbadiana Edmunds & Just, 1983: synonym of Tenellia barbadiana
 Cuthona behrensi Hermosillo & Valdés, 2007: synonym of Tenellia behrensi
 Cuthona berghi (Friele, 1902): synonym of Cuthonella berghi
 Cuthona beta (Baba & Abe, 1964): synonym of Tenellia beta
 Cuthona bractea Burn, 1962: synonym of Tularia bractea (Burn, 1962)
 Cuthona caerulea (Montagu, 1804) synonym of Trinchesia caerulea
 Cuthona claviformis Vicente, 1974: synonym of Tenellia claviformis
 Cuthona cocoachroma Williams & Gosliner, 1979: synonym of Cuthonella cocoachroma
 Cuthona columbiana (O'Donoghue, 1922): synonym of Tenellia columbiana
 Cuthona concinna (Alder & Hancock, 1843): synonym of Cuthonella concinna
 Cuthona correai Ortea, Caballer & Moro, 2002: synonym of Tenellia correai
 Cuthona crinita Minichev, 1972: synonym of Tenellia crinita
 Cuthona destinyae Hermosillo & Valdés, 2007: synonym of Tenellia destinyae
 Cuthona diminutiva Gosliner, 1980: synonym of Tenellia diminutiva
 Cuthona distans Odhner, 1922: synonym of Tenellia distans
 Cuthona diversicolor Baba, 1975: synonym of Tenellia diversicolor
 Cuthona elenae (Martynov, 2000): synonym of Cuthonella elenae
 Cuthona elioti Odhner, 1944: synonym of Cuthonella elioti
 Cuthona ferruginea (Friele, 1902): synonym of Cuthonella ferruginea
 Cuthona fidenciae (Ortea, Moro & Espinosa, 1999): synonym of Tenellia fidenciae
 Cuthona flavovulta (MacFarland, 1966): synonym of Tenellia flavovulta
 Cuthona foliata (Forbes & Goodsir, 1839): synonym of Tenellia foliata
 Cuthona fructuosa (Bergh, 1892): synonym of Tenellia fructuosa
 Cuthona fulgens (MacFarland, 1966): synonym of Tenellia fulgens
 Cuthona futairo Baba, 1963: synonym of Tenellia futairo
 Cuthona genovae (O'Donoghue, 1929): synonym of Tenellia genovae
 Cuthona georgiana (Pfeffer in Martens & Pfeffer, 1886): synonym of Tenellia georgiana
 Cuthona giarannae Valdés, Moran & Woods, 2012 : synonym of Tenellia giarannae
 Cuthona granosa (Schmekel, 1966): synonym of Tenellia granosa
 Cuthona gymnota (Couthouy, 1838): synonym of Tenellia gymnota 
 Cuthona hamanni Behrens, 1987: synonym of Tenellia hamanni
 Cuthona henrici Eliot, 1916: synonym of Tenellia henrici
 Cuthona herrerai Ortea, Moro & Caballer, 2002: synonym of Tenellia herrerai
 Cuthona hiemalis Roginskaya, 1987: synonym of Cuthonella hiemalis (Roginskaya, 1987)
 Cuthona ilonae (Schmekel, 1968): synonym of Tenellia ilonae
 Cuthona iris Edmunds & Just, 1983: synonym of Tenellia iris
 Cuthona japonica Baba, 1937: synonym of Godiva japonica (Baba, 1937)
 Cuthona kanga (Edmunds, 1970): synonym of Tenellia kanga 
 Cuthona kuiteri Rudman, 1981: synonym of Tenellia kuiteri
 Cuthona lagunae (O'Donoghue, 1926): synonym of Tenellia lagunae
 Cuthona leopardina (Vayssière, 1888): synonym of Tenellia leopardina
 Cuthona lizae Angulo-Campillo & Valdés, 2003: synonym of Tenellia lizae
 Cuthona longi Behrens, 1985: synonym of Tenellia longi
 Cuthona luciae Valdés, Medrano & Bhave, 2016: synonym of Tenellia luciae
 Cuthona macquariensis (Burn, 1973): synonym of Tenellia macquariensis
 Cuthona marisalbi Roginskaya, 1963: synonym of Cuthonella concinna (Alder & Hancock, 1843)
 Cuthona millenae Hermosillo & Valdés, 2007: synonym of Tenellia millenae
 Cuthona miniostriata (Schmekel, 1968): synonym of Tenellia miniostriata
 Cuthona modesta (Eliot, 1907): synonym of Cuthonella modesta
 Cuthona netsica (Er. Marcus & Ev. Marcus, 1960): synonym of Tenellia netsica
 Cuthona norvegica (Odhner, 1929): synonym of Cuthonella norvegica
 Cuthona ocellata (Schmekel, 1966): synonym of Tenellia ocellata
 Cuthona odhneri Er. Marcus, 1959: synonym of Tenellia odhneri
 Cuthona ornata Baba, 1937: synonym of Tenellia ornata
 Cuthona pallida (Eliot, 1906): synonym of Tenellia pallida
 Cuthona paucicirra Minichev, 1972: synonym of Tenellia paucicirra
 Cuthona perca (Er. Marcus, 1958): synonym of Tenellia perca
 Cuthona peregrina (Gmelin, 1791): synonym of Cratena peregrina (Gmelin, 1791)
 Cuthona phoenix Gosliner, 1981: synonym of Tenellia phoenix
 Cuthona pinnifera (Baba, 1949): synonym of Tenellia pinnifera
 Cuthona poritophages Rudman, 1979: synonym of Tenellia poritophages
 Cuthona puellula (Baba, 1955): synonym of Tenellia puellula
 Cuthona pumilio Bergh, 1871: synonym of Tenellia pumilio
 Cuthona punicea Millen, 1986: synonym of Tenellia punicea
 Cuthona purpureoanulata (Baba, 1961): synonym of Abronica purpureoanulata
 Cuthona pusilla (Bergh, 1898): synonym of Tenellia pusilla
 Cuthona pustulata (Alder & Hancock, 1854): synonym of Tenellia pustulata
 Cuthona riosi Hermosillo & Valdés, 2008: synonym of Tenellia riosi
 Cuthona rolleri Gosliner & Behrens, 1988: synonym of Tenellia rolleri
 Cuthona rosea MacFarland, 1966: synonym of Cuthona divae (Marcus, 1961)
 Cuthona rubescens Picton & Brown, 1978: synonym of Rubramoena rubescens
 Cuthona rubra (Edmunds, 1964): synonym of Tenellia rubra
 Cuthona rutila (MacFarland, 1966 as Cratena rutila): synonym of Tenellia lagunae (O'Donoghue, 1926)
 Cuthona schraderi (Pfeffer in Martens & Pfeffer, 1886): synonym of Guyvalvoria paradoxa (Eliot, 1907) (nomen dubium)
 Cuthona scintillans Miller, 1977: synonym of Tenellia scintillans
 Cuthona sibogae (Bergh, 1905): synonym of Tenellia sibogae
 Cuthona spadix (MacFarland, 1966 as Cratena spadix): synonym of Tenellia columbiana (O'Donoghue, 1922)
 Cuthona speciosa (Macnae, 1954): synonym of Tenellia speciosa
 Cuthona stimpsoni A. E. Verrill, 1879: synonym of Flabellina salmonacea (Couthouy, 1838)
 Cuthona suecica (Odhner, 1940): synonym of Tenellia suecica
 Cuthona thompsoni Garcia, Lopez-Gonzalez & Garcia-Gomez, 1991: synonym of Tenellia thompsoni
 Cuthona tina (Er. Marcus, 1957): synonym of Tenellia tina
 Cuthona valentini (Eliot, 1907): synonym of Tenellia valentini
 Cuthona veronicae (A. E. Verrill, 1880): synonym of Tenellia veronicae
 Cuthona virens (MacFarland, 1966): synonym of Tenellia virens
 Cuthona viridis (Forbes, 1840): synonym of Tenellia viridis
 Cuthona willani Cervera, Garcia-Gomez & Lopez-Gonzalez, 1992: synonym of Tenellia willani
 Cuthona yamasui Hamatani, 1993: synonym of Tenellia yamasui
 Cuthona zelandica Odhner, 1924: synonym of Tenellia zelandica

References

 Vaught, K.C. (1989). A classification of the living Mollusca. American Malacologists: Melbourne, FL (USA). . XII, 195 pp

External links 
 

Cuthonidae